Dondre Wright (born April 7, 1994) is a professional Canadian football defensive back who is currently a free agent. He was most recently a member of the Toronto Argonauts of the Canadian Football League (CFL).

College career
Wright played college football for the New Mexico Military Institute Broncos and the Henderson State Reddies.

Professional career

Montreal Alouettes
Wright was drafted by the Montreal Alouettes in the third round, 20th overall, in the 2017 CFL Draft and signed with the club on May 17, 2017. He made his professional debut on June 22, 2017 against the Saskatchewan Roughriders where he recorded two defensive tackles and two special teams tackles. He played in all 18 regular season games during the 2017 season where he finished with 45 defensive tackles, 12 special teams tackles, and one forced fumble. In 2018, he spent two stints on the injured list and only played in nine regular season games where he had just two special teams tackles. He was a full participant in the team's 2019 training camp, but was part of the Alouettes' final cuts on June 8, 2019.

Winnipeg Blue Bombers
On July 8, 2019, Wright was signed to a practice roster agreement by the Winnipeg Blue Bombers. He played in three regular season games of the Blue Bombers in 2019. He was on the practice roster when the team won the 107th Grey Cup.

Toronto Argonauts
After becoming a free agent, he signed with the Toronto Argonauts on December 16, 2019. He did not play in 2020 due to the cancellation of the 2020 CFL season and was released by the Argonauts on December 15, 2020.

Montreal Alouettes (II)
On September 14, 2021, it was announced that Wright had re-signed with the Montreal Alouettes to a practice roster agreement. He spent a month on the practice roster before being released on October 17, 2021.

Toronto Argonauts (II)
On October 24, 2021, Wright re-signed with the Toronto Argonauts. However, after spending time on the practice roster, he was released on November 3, 2021.

References

External links
Toronto Argonauts bio 

1994 births
Living people
Montreal Alouettes players
Winnipeg Blue Bombers players
Toronto Argonauts players
New Mexico Military Institute Broncos football players
Henderson State Reddies football players
Canadian football defensive backs
Players of Canadian football from Ontario
People from Ajax, Ontario